Events from the year 1778 in Sweden

Incumbents
 Monarch – Gustav III

Events
 April - The king introduces the costume reform Nationella dräkten to give the population a standard costume to wear and thereby avoid the great waste of clothing. In reality, however, the costume comes to be worn only as a court costume.
 20 October - First issue of Stockholms-Posten
 Capital punishment in Sweden is abolished for infanticide, rape, adultery, bigamy, witchcraft and repeated theft.{
 Barnamordsplakatet secures the right to anonymity for, and bans persecution of, unwed mothers to protect them from the social stigma which could cause infanticide. 
 The pregnancy of Queen Sophia Magdalena is announced after twelve years of childless marriage for the royal couple. The Queen Dowager is involved supporting rumors that Adolf Fredrik Munck is the real father, resulting in a court scandal. The Munck affair ends with the Queen Dowager forced to officially retract her support for such rumors.

Births
 
 30 April - Arvid David Hummel, entomologist  (died 1836)
 - Wilhelmina Krafft, painter (died 1828)
 - Carolina Kuhlman, actress (died 1866)
 - Aurora Wilhelmina Koskull, salonist (died 1852)

Deaths

 10 January – Carl Linnaeus, botanist, zoologist and physician (born 1707)

References

 
Years of the 18th century in Sweden
Sweden